Correntina is a municipality in the state of Bahia in Brazil, 500 km from Brasilia and 980 km from Salvador.  In 2020, the population was estimated at 32,191.

History

Correntina was first mentioned in the dispatches of the Entradistas and Bandereirantes who visited the city in 1700 and 1790.

The Decree Federal Law of nº 311 signed by Getúlio Vargas on March 2, 1938, authorizing that the States made the territorial divisions, it was that, for the State Decree of nº 10.724, signed for the Federal interventor Landulpho Alves, in 30 of March 1938, the Village received the forum from City, under the baton of the Intendant Major Félix Joaquin de Araújo, however, they had only come to commemorate in 01 of January 1939, considering the delay in the art of if communicating.

Geography
The "Correntina", "Arojado", "Saint Antonio", "Guará" and "Rio do meio" rivers run near or through Correntina, and the Island of the Ranchão lies in the Correntina river. 1,200 meters away from the central city, the "Sete Ilhas" ("Seven Islands") form an archipelago, typical of the city's natural environment.

References

Municipalities in Bahia